

IDD service
011 (PT Waves-Palau Telecoms)
011 (PNCC – Palau National Communications Corporation)
012 (PMC – Palau Mobile Corporation)

National Significant Numbers (NSN)
seven digits (fixed)
seven digits (mobile)

Area codes in Palau
Long-distance call service (PNCC)

Mobile service

Emergency call service
911

Local call service
1~9

Company code (carrier code)
PT Waves (Palau Telecoms)
Palau National Communications Corporation (PNCC)
Palau Mobile Corporation (PMC)

See also 
 Telecommunications in Palau

References

Palau
Communications in Palau